Luiz de Almeida (born 20 August 1941) is a Brazilian weightlifter. He competed at the 1968 Summer Olympics and the 1972 Summer Olympics.

References

External links
 

1941 births
Living people
Brazilian male weightlifters
Olympic weightlifters of Brazil
Weightlifters at the 1968 Summer Olympics
Weightlifters at the 1972 Summer Olympics
Sportspeople from Bahia
Pan American Games medalists in weightlifting
Pan American Games bronze medalists for Brazil
Weightlifters at the 1967 Pan American Games
20th-century Brazilian people
21st-century Brazilian people